Ihor Kharchenko (born May 15, 1962 in Kyiv, Ukraine) is a Ukrainian diplomat: an Ambassador Extraordinary and Plenipotentiary of Ukraine.

Education 
Ihor Kharchenko graduated from Taras Shevchenko National University of Kyiv in 1985, master's Degree in International Relations;
Doctorate in Historical Science (PhD) (1988).

Career 
1992 – 1997 — First Secretary, Counsellor, Director, Department of Policy Analysis and Planning, Ministry of Foreign Affairs of Ukraine
 
1997 – 1998 — worked Deputy Permanent Representative of Ukraine to the United Nations. Chief of staff Office of the President of the UN General Assembly.
 
1998 – 2000 — Ambassador Extraordinary and Plenipotentiary of Ukraine to Romania.
 
2000 – 2003 — was in office of Deputy Minister of Foreign Affairs of Ukraine, Deputy State Secretary, Special Envoy of Ukraine to the Balkans.
 
2003 – 2006 — Ambassador Extraordinary and Plenipotentiary of Ukraine to Poland.
 
2006 – 2010 — Ambassador Extraordinary and Plenipotentiary of Ukraine to the United Kingdom of Great Britain and Northern Ireland, Permanent Representative of Ukraine to the International Maritime Organization.
 
2010 – 2013 — Ambassador, Special Representative of Ukraine for Transnistrian Settlement.
 
2013 – 2020 — Ambassador Extraordinary and Plenipotentiary of Ukraine to Japan.

References

External links
 Embassy of Ukraine to Japan
 Former Ambassadors of Ukraine to the United Kingdom
 Ambassador of Ukraine to Japan Dr. Ihor Kharchenko participated in the 69th Hiroshima Peace Memorial Ceremony
 Ukraine Ambassador Ihor Kharchenko calls referendum "invalid"

Living people
1962 births
Ambassadors of Ukraine to Japan
Ambassadors of Ukraine to Poland
Ambassadors of Ukraine to the United Kingdom
Ambassadors of Ukraine to Romania
Ukrainian politicians